Beta Gamma Sigma is the International Business Honor Society. Founded in 1913 at the University of Wisconsin, University of Illinois and the University of California, it has over 980,000 members, selected from more than 600 collegiate chapters in business schools accredited by AACSB International. Founded in the United States, it has collegiate chapters in over 190 countries.

Mission and purpose
The mission of Beta Gamma Sigma is to encourage and honor academic achievement in the study of business; cultivate and celebrate leadership and professional excellence and build their professional skills; to foster an enduring commitment to honor and integrity, the pursuit of wisdom, earnestness, and service; and to serve its lifetime members by helping them network and connect to each other.

Beta Gamma Sigma members reside in over 190 countries and there are more than 50 alumni chapters and networking groups located in major metropolitan areas and other regions throughout the world. These alumni groups provide ongoing educational and networking opportunities for members—both in person and virtually.

Beta Gamma Sigma is the largest alumni group in the world for graduates of business programs.

Membership eligibility requirements include that a student must be in the top 10% of a bachelors business program (top 20% for masters programs, and all doctoral students) Undergraduates are inducted toward the end of their degree program, but no earlier than after completion of 50% of the coursework or the last semester of the 3rd (junior) year for those in 4-year bachelor's degrees.  Doctoral students are eligible for membership after having successfully defended their dissertation.

Societal Impact 
In 2020, Beta Gamma Sigma added new societal impact standards and practices. They believe that business can be a force for global good and have committed to incorporating the environmental, social, & governance (ESGs) criteria and the Sustainable Development Goals (SDGs) into their business operations and programming. BGS joins their partner organization AACSB and universities across the globe, in putting a major focus on societal impact and corporate citizenship.

Some environmental and sustainability initiatives include:

 The BGS x SDGs Lab Leadership Conference, a virtual conference focused on connecting, educating, and empowering participants to be catalysts for change in their communities.
 The BGS Gives Back Program, sponsored by KPMG, encourages BGS members to give back and make a difference in their local communities. 
 A commitment to diversity, equity, inclusion and belonging. This includes ongoing DEIB and cultural competency training for BGS staff and developing opportunities for members to connect and learn from one another.
 A commitment to greener business practices, such as:
 Digitizing Membership Guides and Invitation booklets, which will help reduce their carbon footprint by over 50,000 booklets;
 Consciously selecting vendors committed to recycling, donation, and sustainability; 
 Hybrid work environment to reduce carbon emissions from daily commutes.

History 
These were: Beta Gamma Sigma (1907) at the University of Wisconsin, the Economics Club (1906) at the University of California, and Delta Kappa Chi (1910) at the University of Illinois. The three are considered co-equal founding institutions.

In 1919 Beta Gamma Sigma was designated by the American Association of Collegiate Schools of Business (AACSB) as "the scholarship society" for students in commerce and business administration. Today, only AACSB schools are eligible to host chapters.

On April 29, 1933, Beta Gamma Sigma merged with Gamma Epsilon Pi, a similar organization that had been formed to serve women. Gamma Epsilon Pi had been founded on March 26, 1918, also at the University of Illinois.  Beta Gamma Sigma was older, by five years, and the Society retained its name.

Governance of the society is by convention, held biennially, with intermediate administration vested in a Board of Governors, these holding staggered, four-year terms.

The organization is also a member of the Association of College Honor Societies.

Significance of Initials
The Society explains its name in its Recognition Ceremony (public): 
Beta is the initial letter of the Greek word BEBAEOS, which signifies honor.  Honor is personal integrity and excellence of character.  It is an enduring quality found in all persons who deserve to lead others.  All honorable persons conscientiously seek to recognize, to uphold, and to encourage that which is ethical and that which is just.  Honor is a guiding star which encourages altruism, enlightened social responsibility, and service rather than selfishness.

Gamma is the initial letter of the Greek word GNOSIS, which means wisdom.  Wisdom is knowledge tested by experience and tempered by discerning judgment.  It abhors prejudice, it insists upon freedom of thought and expression.  Persons of wisdom constantly seek a better comprehension and more fruitful application of what is known.  They are also endlessly engaged in a quest for an understanding of what is unknown.  Confronted by a veritable flood of facts and concepts, the person of wisdom exercises special discrimination to select, to arrange, to relate, to interpret, and to apply.  This is a challenge worthy of the finest mind.

Sigma is the initial letter of the Greek word SPOUDE, which means earnestness.  Earnestness is enthusiasm measured by achievement, disciplined by reason and ennobled by sincerity. It is that dynamic quality which is essential for all great achievement. Without Earnestness, both Honor and Wisdom lose much of their potential effectiveness. The greatest personal achievements are tributes to the blending of honor, wisdom and earnestness in the minds and hearts of those who lead.  Rewards for the individual and progress for society surely proceed from this wholesome union of qualities.

Board members

 Mary A. Gowan – University of North Georgia (Board Chair)
 John Navin — Ohio Northern University (Vice Chair)
 Bernard J. Milano — Retired former President, KPMG Foundation (Secretary/Treasurer)
 Christina Allrich — Beta Gamma Sigma (BGS Executive Director)
 Wes Hamilton-Jessop — The University of Sydney
 Linda Hadley — Columbus State University
 Lawrence Singleton — Pace University
 Joyce Strawser — Seton Hall University
 Jodi Weiss — Korn Ferry
 Caryn Beck-Dudley — President and CEO, AACSB International
 Blane Ruschak — President, KPMG Foundation
 Anthony Wilbon — Howard University
 Ken Merritt — Korn Ferry
 Nicole Thorne Jenkins — University of Virginia
 Narjess Boubakri — American University of Sharjah
 Robert Walsh — University of Dallas
 Reto Steiner — ZHAW School of Management and Law

Notable members
Lowell C. Smith, president of Nichols College
Bengt Holmstrom, 2016 Nobel Prize Winner in Economics
Ann-Marie Campbell, Executive Vice-President of Home Depot
Marillyn Hewson, President and CEO of Lockheed Martin Corporation
Ellen Kullman, Former Board Chair & CEO of Dupont
Alan Greenspan, Former Chairman of the Federal Reserve
Gerek Meinhardt – 2016 Olympian Fencing Team
John Hanki – Inventor of Pokémon Go
Eugene T. Lee – Esq President of MBK Sports Management
Sally Krawcheck – Co-founder & CEO of Ellevest Global Woman’s Index Fund

See also
 Alpha Kappa Psi , professional
 Delta Sigma Pi , professional
 Phi Gamma Nu , professional, originally women's
 Phi Chi Theta , professional, originally women's
 Epsilon Eta Phi , merged into 

 Delta Mu Delta , honor, (ACBSP)
 Pi Omega Pi , honor, business education teachers
 Sigma Beta Delta , honor, (non-AACSB schools)

 Alpha Beta Gamma , honor, (2-yr schools)
 Kappa Beta Delta , honor, (2-yr schools, (ACBSP)

 AACSB schools
 Association of College Honor Societies

References

External links
 Beta Gamma Sigma Headquarters
 Beta Gamma Sigma at Association of College Honor Societies

Association of College Honor Societies
Honor societies
Student organizations established in 1913
1913 establishments in Wisconsin